Alberto Pagani (29 August 1938 – 11 September 2017) was an Italian professional Grand Prix motorcycle road racer. His best year was in 1972 when he finished second in the 500cc world championship, behind his MV Agusta teammate, Giacomo Agostini. He was the son of Nello Pagani, the 1949 125 cc World Champion.

Motorcycle Grand Prix results 
Points system from 1950 to 1968:

Points system from 1969 onwards:

(key) (Races in bold indicate pole position; races in italics indicate fastest lap)

References 

1938 births
2017 deaths
Sportspeople from Milan
Italian motorcycle racers
125cc World Championship riders
250cc World Championship riders
350cc World Championship riders
500cc World Championship riders
Isle of Man TT riders